Gathehu is a settlement in Kenya's Central Province which is located 35 km (21 miles) South West of Mount Kenya, and is the second largest mountain on the African continent.

References 

Populated places in Central Province (Kenya)